D. commutata may refer to:

 Daphnia commutata, a water flea
 Dicranota commutata, a hairy-eyed cranefly
 Drepanogynis commutata, a geometer moth